Václav Pantůček (24 November 1934 in Mikulov, Czechoslovakia – 21 July 1994 in Brno, Czech Republic) was a Czech ice hockey player who competed in the 1956 Winter Olympics and in the 1960 Winter Olympics.

References

1934 births
1994 deaths
Czech ice hockey forwards
Ice hockey players at the 1956 Winter Olympics
Ice hockey players at the 1960 Winter Olympics
Olympic ice hockey players of Czechoslovakia
People from Mikulov
HC Sparta Praha players
HC Kometa Brno players
Sportspeople from the South Moravian Region
Czechoslovak ice hockey forwards
Czech ice hockey coaches
Czechoslovak ice hockey coaches
Czechoslovak expatriate sportspeople in Yugoslavia
Czechoslovak expatriate sportspeople in West Germany
Czechoslovak expatriate ice hockey people